Gordon David King (born February 3, 1956) is a former American football offensive tackle in the National Football League (NFL) for the New York Giants and the New York Jets.  He played college football at Stanford University and was drafted in the first round (tenth overall) of the 1978 NFL Draft.

References

1956 births
Living people
Sportspeople from Madison, Wisconsin
Players of American football from Wisconsin
American football offensive tackles
Stanford Cardinal football players
New York Giants players
New York Jets players